Mount Greylock is a  mountain located in the northwest corner of Massachusetts and is the highest point in the state. Its summit is in the western part of the town of Adams (near its border with Williamstown) in Berkshire County. Geologically, Mount Greylock is part of the Taconic Mountains, which are not associated with the abutting Berkshire Mountains to the east. The mountain is known for its expansive views encompassing five states and the only taiga-boreal forest in the state. A seasonal automobile road (open annually from late May through November 1) climbs to the summit, topped by a  lighthouse-like Massachusetts Veterans War Memorial Tower. A network of hiking trails traverses the mountain, including the Appalachian Trail. Mount Greylock State Reservation was created in 1898 as Massachusetts' first public land for the purpose of forest preservation.

Geography
The summit of Mount Greylock is located in Adams, Massachusetts, but the mountain also extends into Cheshire, Lanesborough, New Ashford, North Adams and Williamstown. The range includes peaks with elevation less than Greylock, such as Saddle Ball Mountain and Mount Fitch.

The northwest side of Mount Greylock drains into the Green River, then into the Hoosic River, Hudson River, and New York Harbor. The south side drains into Town Brook, then into the Housatonic River and Long Island Sound. The rest drains into the Hoosic River.

Geology and ecosystem
Mount Greylock and the neighboring Taconic Mountains are composed predominantly of Ordovician phyllite, a metamorphic rock, overlain on younger layers of metamorphized sedimentary rock, especially marble. Mount Greylock is the product of thrust faulting, a tectonic process by which older rock is thrust up and above younger rock during periods of intense mountain building. The younger, underlying marble bedrock layers have been quarried in the lower foothills of the mountain in nearby Adams and North Adams, Massachusetts.

Glacial history
Glaciation rounded and wore down the mountain, carving out U-shaped valleys and leaving glacial erratics such as the Balanced Rock in Lanesborough on the west side of Greylock. The Hopper (a cirque) is located on the west side of Mount Greylock and is the southernmost such glacial feature in New England.

A group of geologists who are interested in determining the rate of the Laurentide Ice Sheet (LIS) thinning are applying a method referred to as the "Dipstick Approach." This approach can potentially trace the lowering of the ice sheet over time by composing of a series of Cosmogenic Nuclide ages at a range of elevations from a location of significant relief or topography. Cosmogenic Nuclides are radioactive isotopes formed when high-energy particles (i.e. cosmic rays) interact with the nuclei of Solar System atoms which constantly penetrate rocks on Earth's surface. Calculating the abundance of these nuclides is a way to determine the age of exposure of surface rock, also called Surface Exposure Dating. This approach has been used on Scandinavian, Antarctic, & Greenland ice sheets, and is now being applied to glacially eroded boulder and bedrock surfaces from various mountains in New England, such as Mount Greylock. The research supports rapid de-glaciation in New England around the retreat of the Laurentide Ice Sheet, which further constrains previous estimates of the LIS thinning rate.

Forests and old growth

During the 19th century, much of the mountain was denuded by logging, fires, and grazing. Forests have since reclaimed the mountain. Several forest communities exist on Mount Greylock. Lower slopes are inhabited by northern hardwood forest species while upper summits are dominated by boreal balsam fir and red spruce. The ridgeline of Greylock, between Mount Fitch on the north and Saddle Ball on the south, is the only place in Massachusetts where a taiga-boreal or sub-alpine forest flourishes. Researchers have identified  of old growth forest on the mountain. The steep western slopes (which include The Hopper) contain northern hardwood forest biome species up to 350 years old, including a  red spruce. Because of its extensive stands of red spruce old growth, The Hopper has been designated a National Natural Landmark.

Mount Greylock is designated as an important bird area (IBA). There are a number of species of birds that breed in the taiga or boreal forests at the higher altitudes of the mountain, which are not normally found breeding in Massachusetts. These species include the blackpoll warbler and Bicknell's thrush. eBird has records of 132 species of birds on Mount Greylock. There is less known about birds visiting the mountain in winter, as the mountain is more difficult to access during this time.

History

Early history and naming
Prior to the arrival of Europeans the Mahican people were closely associated with this region. The traditional trade route connecting the tribes of the Hudson and Connecticut River valleys (today, Route 2, known as the Mohawk Trail) passes beneath the northern flank of Mount Greylock.

The mountain was known to 18th century English settlers as Grand Hoosuc(k). In the early 19th century it was called Saddleback Mountain because of its appearance (Saddle Ball, the name of the peak to the south, still reflects this).

The origin of the present name of Greylock and its association with the mountain is unclear. It first appeared in print about 1819, and came into popular use by the 1830s. It is believed to be in tribute to a legendary Native American chief, Gray Lock. Gray Lock (c. 1670–1750) was a Western Abenaki Missisquoi chief of Woronoco-Pocomtuc ancestry, born near Westfield, Massachusetts. Gray Lock distinguished himself by conducting guerrilla raids into Vermont and western Massachusetts.

Timothy Dwight IV, President of Yale University, along with Williams College President Ebenezer Fitch, climbed Greylock in 1799, probably over a rough route cut by a local pioneer farmer Jeremiah Wilbur (in that time more land had been cleared on the slopes for farming than today). His account in Travels in New England and New York describes the experience, although he noted the summit vegetation was so thick he and Fitch had to climb a balsam fir tree to get a better view:

The 19th century
Williams College, founded in 1793 in nearby Williamstown, has always been closely associated with Greylock and the study of its natural history. On May 12, 1830, a group of students directed by college President Edward Dorr Griffin improved and further cut a trail from the end of the Hopper Road to the summit. Today this route is the Hopper Trail, traditionally climbed by students once a year on Mountain Day.

In May 1831 the first wooden meteorological observatory, "Griffin's Tower", was built on the summit by students. Nine years later, it was replaced by a more substantial 60-foot (20 m) tall wooden observatory tower, from which Donati's Comet was photographed in 1858. In 1863 the first organized hiking and nature study club in the United States, the Alpine Club, was founded by Professor Albert Hopkins. The club frequently camped on the mountain.

By the mid-19th century, improved transportation into the region attracted many visitors to Greylock. Among them were writers and artists inspired by the mountain scene: Nathaniel Hawthorne, William Cullen Bryant, Oliver Wendell Holmes, Herman Melville, and Henry David Thoreau.

In the summer of 1838, Hawthorne had visited North Adams, Massachusetts, and climbed Mount Greylock several times. His experiences there, specifically a walk he took at midnight where he saw a burning lime kiln, inspired his story, originally titled "The Unpardonable Sin". Hawthorne had not written tales since 1844 when he wrote "Ethan Brand" in the winter of 1848–1849.

Melville is said to have taken part of his inspiration for Moby-Dick from the view of the mountain from his house Arrowhead in Pittsfield, since its snow-covered profile reminded him of a great white sperm whale's back breaking the ocean's surface. Melville dedicated his next novel, Pierre, to "Greylock's Most Excellent Majesty", calling the mountain "my own ... sovereign lord and king". In August 1851 Melville and a few friends, including the young poet Sarah Morewood, camped for a night on Greylock's summit. Thoreau summited and spent a night in July 1844. His account of this event in A Week on the Concord and Merrimack Rivers described his approach up what is today the Bellows Pipe Trail. Scholars contend that this Greylock experience transformed him, affirming his ability to do these excursions on his own, following his brother John's death; and served as a prelude to his experiment of rugged individualism at Walden Pond the following year in 1845.

By the late 19th century, clearcutting logging practices had stripped much of the mountain for local industries that produced wood products, paper and charcoal. Along with this came devastating forest fires and landslides. Following a fire on the summit, a group of local businessmen concerned about the mountain incorporated the Greylock Park Association (GPA) on July 20, 1885, and purchased  on the summit. The GPA also undertook long-needed repairs to the Notch Road so that carriages could access the top. Aside from shares to fund its operation, the GPA charged a 25-cent toll for the carriage road and a 10-cent fee to ascend the iron observation tower (built 1889). These fees are equivalent to $ in present-day dollars.

By early 1897, with the GPA venture in debt, conservation interests in the state sought to protect the mountain through other means. Legislation was filed by William H. Chase, editor of the Berkshire Sunday Democrat of North Adams, under the auspices of the Board of Trade of North Adams to transfer the GPA land holdings on the mountain to the Commonwealth of Massachusetts for a state reservation. This included supporting testimony from Williams College geology professor T. Nelson Dale, and a $25,000 appropriation bill filed through Judge Arthur M. Robinson. Additional support came from the Massachusetts Forestry Association's initiative to advocate for the establishment of a state park system, and to make the case point, fight inappropriate development of the state's highest peak, Mount Greylock. The principal argument for making the mountain a public reservation was to protect the Hoosic and Housatonic River watersheds from erosion due to recent trends of deforestation (particularly noted on the Adams side). Another concern was to preserve it for the public rather than private and exclusive enjoyment. On June 20, 1898, Mount Greylock State Reservation was created, with the stipulation that the state add to the original land (to ultimately total ). With this acquisition the first public land in Massachusetts for the purpose of forest preservation was created, later to become the state park system. A three-person, governor-appointed Greylock Reservation Commission, a body of Berkshire County government, was entrusted with the care and maintenance of the reservation. The title "Reservation" refers to county management of state land, since there was only one state forester and a handful of state fire wardens in service at the time; similarly other early State Reservation properties in Massachusetts were previously managed and operated by county commissions for the state.

The 20th century
In 1906, Berkshire County began survey and construction of another approach, the first direct route from the south to the summit. It was opened to the public on September 16, 1907, running "through six farms ... passing Round's Rock, a fine view point, and throughout its entire distance affords unsurpassed views of Berkshire hills and valleys lying to the south and west of the reservation". Afterwards the Commission turned its attention to the foot trail development, and by 1913 it was able to boast that 17 trails existed on the mountain.

By 1929, the Appalachian Trail route up Mount Greylock was first cut, and most of the Massachusetts section route was complete by 1931. Due to disputes between the local Berkshire Hills Conference trail group and both the Appalachian Trail Conference and the Appalachian Mountain Club Berkshire Chapter, the trail was in jeopardy of growing back in until the local Mount Greylock Ski Club assumed maintenance in 1937.

The greatest period of development on Mount Greylock occurred in the 1930s. The Massachusetts (Veterans) War Memorial Tower on the summit was constructed (1931–32). The Civilian Conservation Corps (CCC) 107th Company, MA camp SP-7, from 1933 to 1941 made extensive improvements on roads, trails, scenic vistas, firebreaks, forest health improvement, and recreation area development.

Some of the more significant CCC features included development of the road system (gravel surfaced) to accommodate automobiles, Adirondack lean-to shelters, the Thunderbolt Ski Shelter, and completion of Bascom Lodge. As a result of increased popularity of winter recreation and downhill skiing, the Mount Greylock Ski Club initiated a plan to create a challenging ski run on Mount Greylock. The planning skills of Dwight J. Francis and Western Massachusetts Winter Sports Council, including input from Williams, Amherst, Smith, Mount Holyoke, and Massachusetts State Colleges, Greenfield Outing Club, and the Green Mountain Club, resulted in the CCC building the Thunderbolt Ski Trail in 1934 (named for its resemblance to a Revere Beach, MA, roller coaster). The lower section of the Thunderbolt Trail was relocated in 1936 by Charles L. Parker. This ski trail was rated Expert-Class A by the United States Eastern Amateur Ski Association (USEASA, today the United States Ski and Snowboard Association) and later host site for the USEASA Championship Races in 1938 and 1940. The trail was used for numerous competitive downhill ski races up until 1959.

Based on the popular response to winter recreation at Mount Greylock, a New York-based group expressed interest to the Greylock Commission to develop a cable tramway and downhill ski area on the southwest portion of mountain in 1941. The proposal, though defeated, initiated an ongoing debate between the use of Mount Greylock (State) Reservation for commercial development and open hunting versus conservation purposes.

In October 1966, following years of legal disputes over the Greylock Commission's perceived abuses of allowing public land for commercial use, a conservation group called the Mount Greylock Protective Association led a campaign that transferred ultimate responsibility for management and operation of the mountain from Berkshire County to the state park system.

State parks
Today, the  Mount Greylock State Reservation is managed and operated by the Massachusetts Department of Conservation and Recreation, Division of State Parks and Recreation.

Mount Greylock has over 70 miles of designated trails for hiking, mountain biking, back-country skiing, snowshoeing and snowmobiling, including an 11.5 mile section of the Appalachian National Scenic Trail. A primitive camping experience is available for backpackers at either the Mount Greylock Campground or 5 remote trailside backpacker shelters; the campground is only accessible by foot, as are the backpacker shelters.

The staffed visitors center in Lanesborough is open year-round (1.5 miles off Route 7) and provides orientation, trail maps, informational brochures, exhibits, and accessible rest rooms. Five lean-to shelters and Mount Greylock Campground are available for backpacking. About  of trails are located on the mountain, including the Appalachian Trail.

The Greylock Glen, site of a former proposed tramway/ski/resort development from 1953 to 1977, is a  park located in the town of Adams, adjoining Mount Greylock State Reservation. It was acquired by the state in 1985 to create a regional economic facility in the form of a joint public-private development.

Structures on the mountain
Prominent features on the summit are the Massachusetts Veterans War Memorial Tower, Bascom Lodge, the Thunderbolt Ski Shelter, and a television and radio tower. Because of the cultural significance of the mountain and excellent examples CCC period park structures, the Mount Greylock Summit Historic District was added to the National Register of Historic Places in on April 20, 1998, reference number 98000349.

Veterans War Memorial Tower

The Veterans War Memorial Tower was approved by the state legislature in October 1930, supported by Senator Theodore Plunkett of Adams and Governor Frank G. Allen. A war memorial had been proposed as early as 1918 for Boston's Charles River Basin; other proposed locations included Beacon Hill and Copley Square. After more than a decade of debate, Mount Greylock was selected as the site for the monument. It was designed by Boston-based architects Maginnis & Walsh, and built by contractors J.G. Roy & Son of Springfield in 1931–32 at a cost of $200,000. It takes the form of a perpetually lighted beacon to honor the state's dead from World War I (and subsequent conflicts). The light was at the time the strongest beacon in Massachusetts, with a nighttime visible range of up to 70 miles. The architectural design of the tower, a  shaft with eight frieze-framed observation openings, was intended to have no suggestion of Utilitarianism but instead to display classic austerity. It includes some minor Art Deco details such as the decorative eagle on the base which were designed in part by John Bizzozero of Quincy, Massachusetts [Bizzozero also designed details on the Vermont Capitol building]. Inside it is a domed chamber for a reverential shine that was intended to store tablets and war relicts from wartime units in the state's history.

Although local legislators and residents advocated for local stone to be used, it was ultimately quarried from Quincy Granite. In part, it bears the inscription "they were faithful even unto death." One of the inscriptions inside the monument is, "Of those immortal dead who live again in the minds made better by their presence", which is a line from a poem by George Eliot. The formal dedication ceremony on June 30, 1933, by Governor Joseph B. Ely was attended by about 1,500 and broadcast nationally over NBC radio.

The Veterans War Memorial Tower was closed in 2013 due to the tower's long-standing problem with water infiltration, which caused structural damage to the granite stonework. During colder months when moisture freezes, it expands in the cracks. According to the state Department of Conservation and Recreation, a $2.6 million restoration project was awarded to Allegrone Construction of Pittsfield that began in August 2015. The Memorial was rededicated by Gov. Charlie Baker and reopened to the public on July 26, 2017.

Bascom Lodge

Bascom Lodge was built between 1932 and 1938 using native materials of Greylock schist and red spruce. Designed by Pittsfield architect, Joseph McArthur Vance, it displays the rustic architectural design of period park structures. The Greylock Commission had desired to rebuild a more substantial shelter for visitors and hikers to the summit after the previous summit house (built c.1902) burned down in 1929. The initial west wing was constructed in 1932 by Jules Emil Deloye, Jr. The main-central and east wings were completed later 1935-38 by the Civilian Conservation Corps, supervised by Deloye. The lodge was named in honor of John Bascom, a Greylock Reservation Commissioner and Williams College professor, who had a strong association with the mountain during his lifetime.

Today, Bascom Lodge is run by the Bascom Lodge Group, in partnership with the Massachusetts Department of Conservation and Recreation's Historic Curatorship Program.

Thunderbolt Ski Shelter and Ski Race

The Thunderbolt Ski Shelter, also designed by Joseph McArthur Vance, was built in 1940 by the Civilian Conservation Corps to principally serve as a warming hut for skiers using the Thunderbolt Trail. Also rustic in design and built of stone and wood beams, the interior has four wooden benches built into a large four hearth fireplace in the center. There has been a resurgence of interest in skiing the Thunderbolt Trail culminating in the 75th-anniversary race of February 2010 that commemorated the first downhill race on Mount Greylock on February 17, 1935. The Thunderbolt Ski Runners have tried continued the tradition of an annual backcountry ski race each winter. but conditions have disrupted some of the races or forced them to relocated to snow-machine served commercial ski areas. In 2018, Ski Runners decided to pause its commitment to an annual race, and are now holding the race at less frequent intervals. As a result of publicity surrounding the races that have been held, the trail has experienced an increasing number of backcountry skiers during the winter months.

Broadcast tower
One radio and one television station transmit from a broadcast tower below the summit on the west side: WAMC (90.3 Albany, New York); and W38DL (38 Adams, Massachusetts) (repeater of WNYT-TV). A NOAA Weather Radio station (WWF-48, 162.525 MHz) broadcasts from a different tower on the mountain. The Northern Berkshire Amateur Radio Club runs several amateur radio repeaters on the mountain under the callsign K1FFK.

In popular culture
Mount Greylock (Gray-lock) is mentioned in Nathaniel Hawthorne's 1850 short story "Ethan Brand" (From The Snow-Image, and Other Twice-told Tales, 1850, 1852).
Mount Greylock is the dedicatee of Herman Melville's 1852 novel Pierre; or, The Ambiguities, written at his home in Pittsfield, MA. 
Mount Greylock is mentioned in Bill Bryson's 1998 book A Walk in the Woods.
Mount Greylock is the location of Ilvermorny, the North American school of witchcraft and wizardry in the fictional universe of Harry Potter.

Summit panorama

See also

Outline of Massachusetts
Index of Massachusetts-related articles
List of U.S. states by elevation
List of old growth forests in Massachusetts

References

External links

Mount Greylock State Reservation Department of Conservation and Recreation
Hiking Trail Mileages, Mount Greylock State Reservation Department of Conservation and Recreation
Birds of Mount Greylock Department of Conservation and Recreation
Wildflowers of Mount Greylock Department of Conservation and Recreation
Bascom Lodge
Thunderbolt Ski Run, an alpine racing trail from the 1930s still used recreationally today
 Mount Greylock Scenic Byway
 Mt. Greylock New England Lost Ski Areas Project
 Mount Greylock Expeditionary Force Amateur Radio Club

Greylock
Mountains of Berkshire County, Massachusetts
Greylock
Greylock
Greylock
Defunct ski areas and resorts in Massachusetts
North Adams, Massachusetts
Historic districts on the National Register of Historic Places in Massachusetts
Civilian Conservation Corps in Massachusetts
North American 1000 m summits
National Register of Historic Places in Berkshire County, Massachusetts